The Opera Ball is a 1931 German musical comedy film directed by Max Neufeld and starring Iván Petrovich, Liane Haid and Georg Alexander. It was shot at the Halensee Studios in Berlin. The film's sets were designed by the art directors Karl Weber and Erich Zander. It was part of a large group of operetta films made during the decade, although he film is not based on the operetta Der Opernball. The following year it was remade in French as Beauty Spot. A 1932 British remake After the Ball was also made.

Cast
 Iván Petrovich as Dr. Peter v. Bodo
 Liane Haid as Helga Bodo, seine Frau
 Georg Alexander as Georg, sein bester Freund
 Otto Wallburg as von Arnolds - Helgas Vater
 Betty Bird as Vicky, die Zofe
 Irene Ambrus as Ilona Antalffy, die Tänzerin
 Maria Koppenhöfer as Tante Clementine
 Hermann Blaß
 Ludwig Stössel
 Hans Lipschütz

References

Bibliography

External links 
 

1931 films
Films of the Weimar Republic
German musical comedy films
1931 musical comedy films
1930s German-language films
Films directed by Max Neufeld
Operetta films
Bavaria Film films
German black-and-white films
Films shot at Halensee Studios
1930s German films